Milanovo is a village in Svoge Municipality, Sofia Province, western Bulgaria. It has a mayor office, a village square and a church.

References

Villages in Sofia Province